A list of municipalities in South Jersey, the southern part of New Jersey associated with Philadelphia, rather than New York. While the borders are controversial, this page includes the following counties: Camden, Burlington, Gloucester, Atlantic, Cumberland, Salem. Area and density is in square miles, and only includes land area.

municipalities